Mishar Yurt (in Russian chronicles – Мещерский юрт\Meshcherskiy yurt; literally The home of Mişärs) was a semi-autonomous principality of the Golden Horde at the border of Moscow, Nizhny Novgorod and Ryazan duchies.

History

At the epoch of Volga Bulgaria those land, originally inhabited  by Mokshas, was settled by Turkic peoples, tended to be Muslims. In 1298 Hosayen ughli Mohammad from family of Shirin founded a principality that united local Turkic and Finnic peoples. The capital of Mishar Yurt was Mişär (in Russian chronicles Городок-Мещёрский/Gorodok-Meşçórski). In 1393 Tokhtamysh gave Mishar Yurt to Muscovy. After the victory in the Battle of Suzdal in 1445 Vasili II of Russia was forced to present this land to Qasim Khan. Another version is that Qasim Khanate  appeared there was created as a buffer state between Kazan and Moscow.

See also
Mukhsha Ulus
Temnikov Principality
Qasim Khanate
History of Mokshaland

References

Literature
Complete Collection of Russian Chronicles. Postnikovsky chronicler. Vol.34. Moscow, 1978
Complete Collection of Russian Chronicles. Piskarevskiy chronicler. Vol.34. Moscow, 1978
Complete Collection of Russian Chronicles. Moskovsky chronicler. Vol.34. Moscow, 1978
Complete Collection of Russian Chronicles. Belsky chronicler. Vol.34. Moscow, 1978
Славянская энциклопедия. [Slavic encyclopedia] Moscow, 2003. Vol.2, p. 671

External links
Complete Collection of Russian Chronicles (in Russian)
The Tatar Gazette

Golden Horde
Qasim Khanate
Tatar states
Volga Finns
States and territories established in 1298
1298 in the Mongol Empire